Monroe is an unincorporated community in Rusk County, located in the U.S. state of Texas. According to the Handbook of Texas, the community had a population of 96 in 2000. It is located within the Longview, Texas metropolitan area.

History
Monroe was named by the people who moved here from Monroe County, Georgia. A post office was established at Monroe in 1860 and remained in operation until 1904, with two brief interruptions. Mail was then sent from Kilgore. Originally, the community shipped cotton and hay, but in the 1980s, it was dominated by gas and oil. The population was 60 in 1940, then jumped to 140 from 1950 to the 1960s. It went down to 96 from 1972 through 1986, but an unofficial count by residents in 1972 put it at 246. Monroe's community center was built in 1932 and has been used for quiltings, family reunions, plays, receptions, and occasional church activities. It also hosted a voting booth for 1,300 registered voters. Its population was 90 in 1990, then went back up to 96 in 2000.

Geography
Monroe is located in northeastern Rusk County near Wyche Branch, Bonner Creek, and Tiawichi Creek. Texas State Highway 322 exits into Monroe on Farm to Market Road 1249 west.

Education
Today, the community is served by the Kilgore Independent School District.

Notes

Unincorporated communities in Cherokee County, Texas
Unincorporated communities in Texas